Sean Murphy (born June 29, 1984) is an American former professional stock car racing driver who competed in the NASCAR Nationwide Series, NASCAR Camping World Truck Series, IMSA and the ASA Series. He currently is an entrepreneur.

Racing career
Murphy ran two races (at the Miami street course and Road Atlanta) in Konrad Motorsports' No. 25 Saleen S7R in the 2002 American Le Mans Series season, teaming up with Charles Slater in both races as well as Jean-François Yvon at Road Atlanta. He also drove for Konrad in one Grand-Am race at the Daytona road course that year in their No. 31, sharing the car with Franz Konrad.

Murphy made his first start in the NASCAR Craftsman Truck Series at Martinsville Speedway in late 2004 driving for Green Light Racing in the No. 07 Chevrolet Silverado. He had a solid debut, qualifying 19th and finishing 22nd. The deal gave Murphy an opportunity to race for the remaining three races of the season for the team (two races in the No. 07 and one in the No. 08). At the next race at Phoenix, Murphy finished 24th, but also led two laps. At Homestead-Miami, Murphy led ten laps due to pit strategy before his engine expired.

Murphy ran a total of 14 races in 2005-2006, once again all for Green Light Racing. His best finish was a 13th at Atlanta. He earned his first career lead-lap finish at Fontana that year. Also, at Atlanta, Murphy led his only lap on the season. However, sponsorship did not materialize and after the race at Michigan, Green Light found other drivers to drive the truck for the rest of the year.

In February 2007, Murphy competed in the 41st Annual World Series of Asphalt Stock Car Racing at New Smyrna Speedway in New Smyrna Beach, Florida. Murphy was scheduled to race in three races that took place on consecutive nights. Murphy qualified on the pole for the Thursday night race, but rain and thunder caused that night's activities to be canceled. On Friday night, Murphy qualified on the outside pole, but did not start the race due to a mechanical problem with his car. Murphy qualified on the pole for the second time on Saturday, but due to a problem he was forced to start in the rear of the pack. After a long week of frustration and disappointment, the team's hard work finally paid off when Murphy crossed the finish line in 5th place.

Murphy spent 2007 racing with SS Racing and competing for the ASA Super Late Model Challenge Series division title. He was awarded the ASA-Late Model Series Pat Burdow Memorial Rookie of the Year Title on Saturday at Five Flags Speedway. Murphy qualified with the fastest time for the fourth time and set a new ASALMS track record for the three times during the season (all divisions).

Returning to the No. 07 truck of the renamed SS-Green Light Racing in 2008, Murphy earned his first and only top-10 in the Truck Series at Mansfield, which was also his best finish of the season. He drove in five other races after that: Milwaukee, IRP, Bristol, Las Vegas, and Talladega. 

Murphy made his Nationwide Series debut in 2009, running three races (Iowa, Watkins Glen, and Bristol) in the No. 81 Dodge for MacDonald Motorsports. His best finish was a 20th at Bristol. He continued to compete in the Truck Series for SSGLR, this year in the No. 08 in all his starts (due to Chad McCumbee driving the No. 07 full-time in 2009). After running three races in that truck, he drove the No. 21 Dodge for GunBroker Racing at Talladega that year, substituting for Nick Tucker, the normal driver of that truck, who had never raced on a restrictor plate track before and was not cleared to race that weekend.

He returned to SS-Green Light again in 2010, driving the No. 07 truck in the season-opener at Daytona. The team indicated that they wanted him to run the full season if sponsorship could be found, but it was not. The team ended up having multiple drivers in the No. 07 that year, and that race, which Murphy finished 13th in, ended up being his last start in NASCAR.

Personal life
Although he was born in Auckland, New Zealand, Murphy currently resides in Fort Lauderdale, Florida with girlfriend, Julie DeVries, and their two dogs. He works as an entrepreneur. He graduated from Broward College.

Motorsports career results

NASCAR
(key) (Bold – Pole position awarded by qualifying time. Italics – Pole position earned by points standings or practice time. * – Most laps led.)

Nationwide Series

 Season still in progress
 Ineligible for series points

Camping World Truck Series

References

External links
 

1984 births
Living people
NASCAR drivers
New Zealand racing drivers
Racing drivers from Florida
Sportspeople from Fort Lauderdale, Florida
Sportspeople from Auckland